The 2013–14 Primera División season was the 32nd professional season of Venezuela's top-flight football league.

Teams
Eighteen teams participated this season, sixteen of whom remain from the previous season. Monagas and Portuguesa were relegated after accumulating the fewest points in the 2012–13 season aggregate table. They will be replaced by Carabobo and Tucanes, the 2012–13 Segunda División winner and runner-up, respectively.

Torneo Apertura 
The Torneo Apertura will be the first tournament of the season. It began in August 2013 and ended in December 2013.

Standings

Torneo Clausura 
The Torneo Clausura will be the second tournament of the season.

Standings

Aggregate table

Serie Final
Mineros and Zamora qualified to the Serie Final, which was contested on a home and away basis.

Serie Sudamericana
Other than the teams which already qualify for the Copa Libertadores (Apertura and Clausura champions and the best-placed team in the aggregate table) and the Copa Sudamericana (Copa Venezuela champion and the second best-placed team in the aggregate table), the eight best-placed teams in the aggregate table will contest in the Serie Sudamericana for the remaining two berths to the Copa Sudamericana, which qualify the two winners to the First Stage.

In the first round, the matchups are:
Match A (1 vs. 8)
Match B (2 vs. 7)
Match C (3 vs. 6)
Match D (4 vs. 5)
In the second round, the matchups are:
Winner A vs. Winner C
Winner B vs. Winner D
For the two second round winners, the team with the better record in the aggregate table will receive the Venezuela 3 berth, while the other team will receive the Venezuela 4 berth.

First round

Match A

Match B

Match C

Match D

Second round

Winner A vs. Winner C

Winner B vs. Winner D

References

External links 
  of the Venezuelan Football Federation 
Season regulations 
Football-Lineups 

2013 in South American football leagues
2014 in South American football leagues
Venezuelan Primera División seasons
2013–14 in Venezuelan football